The Ultimate Warrior is a 1975 science fiction action-adventure film directed by Robert Clouse. One of a series of post-apocalyptic films from the 1960s and 1970s, it is set in post-civilization New York City in 2012 and depicts the struggles of a small enclave of inhabitants attempting to survive in a compound beset with packs of starving pillagers.

Plot synopsis
Following a global pandemic which devastates the population, Baron (Sydow), the leader of a tribe of survivors, has established a small fortified area in the ruins of New York City. Cal (Kelton), a former scientist and a member of Baron’s tribe, has developed plague-resistant seeds that enable the tribe to grow vegetables in the barren soil. The tribe's small garden has become an oasis in the ruined city, coveted by the packs of starving, lawless gangs outside.

Needing to increase security against the raiders, especially a gang led by Carrot (Smith), Baron recruits a deadly warrior named Carson (Brynner), who has put his skills out for hire.

While Carson’s presence has some of the desired effect, the daily raids against the sanctuary make Baron realize the only hope for his pregnant daughter Melinda (Miles) and his unborn grandchild, is for them to leave the city, and establish a new society in a more secure setting on a small island off the coast of North Carolina.

Escaping from the city is more difficult than anticipated, resulting in the deaths of Baron and many of the tribe and costing Carson his hand. Carson kills Carrot and most of his followers while being chased through the city's subway system. He gets Melinda and the precious seeds out of the city.

Cast
 Yul Brynner as Carson
 Max von Sydow as Baron
 Joanna Miles as Melinda
 William Smith as "Carrot"
 Richard Kelton as Cal
 Darrell Zwerling as Silas
 Gary Johnson as L. Harkness
 Lane Bradbury as Barrie
 Mel Novak as Lippert
 Mickey Caruso as B. Harkness
 Nate Esformes as Garon
 Stephen McHattie as Robert
 Henry Kingi as Carrot's Man

Production
The film was shot on the Warner Brothers back lot and the MGM lot with no location shooting. Director Robert Clouse was deaf and relied on his assistant directors to make sure the dialog was delivered effectively. Shooting with a budget just under a million dollars, Clouse was limited when it came to the use of visual effects and matte paintings for the production. The film returned nearly $9 million in rentals.

Release
The Ultimate Warrior was released on DVD by Warner Home Video on 7/29/08, as a Best Buy exclusive double feature with Battle Beneath the Earth. , UPC# 883929023790.

See also
 List of American films of 1975
Survival film, about the film genre, with a list of related films

References

External links
 
 
 

1975 films
1970s science fiction action films
American science fiction action films
1970s English-language films
American post-apocalyptic films
American pregnancy films
Films directed by Robert Clouse
Films scored by Gil Mellé
Films set in 2012
Films set in New York City
Films set in the future
1970s pregnancy films
1970s American films